The 2002 Islington Council election took place on 2 May 2002 to elect members of Islington London Borough Council in London, England. The whole council was up for election with boundary changes since the last election in 1998 reducing the number of seats by 4. The Liberal Democrats stayed in overall control of the council.

Background
The 1998 election saw the Liberal Democrat and Labour parties finish on 26 seats each, with Labour continuing to run the council with the mayor's casting vote. However, in December 1999 the Liberal Democrats won a majority on the council after gaining a seat from Labour in a by-election. This meant that going into the election the Liberal Democrats had 27 seats, compared to 25 for Labour.

187 candidates stood in the election for the 48 seats being contested, after boundary changes reduced the number of seats by 4. The election was seen as a fight between the Liberal Democrat and Labour parties, with the Green Party aiming to win 1 or 2 seats. The Conservative party did not put candidates for every seat being contested, while the Christian Peoples Alliance, Independent Working Class Association, Socialist Alliance and Socialist Labour Party all stood candidates, as well as several independents.

Issues in the election were reported as being crime, council housing repairs, asset sell-offs and the proposed new Arsenal stadium.

Election result
The results saw the Liberal Democrats retain control of the council with an increased majority after gaining seats from Labour.

Ward results
* - Existing Councillor seeking re-election.

References

2002 London Borough council elections
2002